Hu Ge (born 20 September 1982), also known as Hugh Hu, is a Chinese actor and singer. While studying at the Shanghai Theater Academy, he was invited to play the leading role Li Xiaoyao in the 2005 television series Chinese Paladin, and immediately skyrocketed to fame as one of China's most popular actors. Since then, he has starred in several iconic historical television series; such as The Little Fairy (2006), The Young Warriors (2006), The Legend of the Condor Heroes (2008), Chinese Paladin 3 (2009), The Myth (2010), Xuan-Yuan Sword: Scar of Sky (2012) and Sound of the Desert (2014). 
In September 2012, he was nominated for Best Newcomer at the 31st Hundred Flowers Awards for his role as Lin Juemin in Chinese historical film 1911 (2012). 
Hu gained widespread acclaim with his roles as Ming Tai in the spy drama The Disguiser (2015) and Mei Changsu in the wuxia drama  Nirvana in Fire, for which he received the Best Actor Award at the 22nd Magnolia Awards and the Golden Eagle Awards. He ranked 24th on the Forbes China Celebrity 100 List for 2020.

Early life and education
Hu Ge was born in Shanghai on 20 September 1982. He received his first training in performing arts in Little Stars Performing Arts School run by Shanghai Media Group (SMG). Hu Ge attended Shanghai Xiang Yang Elementary School (1989–94) and Shanghai No.2 High School (1994–2001), both known for their educational rigor.

In addition to excellent academic work, Hu Ge's talents in a variety of extracurricular endeavors were also recognized. At age 14, Hu Ge started to host a popular TV show Sunshine Youth on Shanghai TV Education Channel for three years. Meanwhile, he was also selected to host a program in East Radio Shanghai. Hu Ge began his acting career by appearing in TV commercials, which helped him gain financial independence before graduating from high school.

In 2001, Hu Ge was admitted to two prestigious art institutes in China: the Central Academy of Drama and Shanghai Theatre Academy. Hu Ge decided to attend the latter, particularly attracted by its strong major in acting.

Career

2002–2006: Beginnings and rise to fame
While he was still studying, Hu Ge was recommended by his friend to Chinese Entertainment Shanghai (now known as Tangren Media) where he acted as a dub voice actor for the 2002 television drama The Book and the Sword (书剑恩仇录). Following which, he signed on with the company. After appearing in numerous commercials, Hu starred in the film Pretend There's No Feeling (假裝沒感覺) with a minor role. His first television role was in the romance drama Dandelion (蒲公英).

Hu rose to prominence in 2005 when he was cast to play the protagonist Li Xiaoyao in Chinese Paladin, the first television adaptation of the popular adventure role-playing video game The Legend of Sword and Fairy. The television series was a major hit in China and launched Hu to instant fame. The theme song sung by him, "June Rain" was also widely popular. The same year, he also portrayed Ning Caichen in the television series Strange Tales of Liao Zhai.

After Chinese Paladin, Hu Ge embarked on a number of other TV projects, most of which were period dramas and historical fantasies, most notably as Dong Yong in The Little Fairy (2006); based on the Chinese folktale Tian Xian Pei and as Yang Yanzhao in The Young Warriors (2006); based on the play The Generals of the Yang Family. He then starred in the horror film The 601st Phone Call (2006), where he received rave reviews for his performance.

In October 2006, Hu made his debut as a singer with the release of his first EP, titled Treasure (珍惜).

2008–2012: Comeback after accident and continued success
After a hiatus, Hu returned to the screen, reuniting with co-star, Ariel Lin (from The Little Fairy) and starred as Guo Jing in The Legend of the Condor Heroes (2008), adapted from Louis Cha's novel of the same title. Hu was highly praised for his portrayal, along with co-star Ariel Lin. He also co-starred with Wu Chun and Charlene Choi in The Butterfly Lovers (2008), based on the famous Chinese legend Butterfly Lovers.

On 15 May 2008, Hu released his second album, Start (出發), and embarked on his first solo concert in Shanghai.

Hu played three different reincarnations of the main character in Chinese Paladin 3 (2009), while also reprising his role as Li Xiaoyao in a time-travelling cameo appearance. The series, adapted from the third game of the The Legend of Sword and Fairy series, achieved high ratings and was awarded the Ratings Contribution Award at the Sichuan Festival.

Hu next starred as the male protagonist in The Myth (2010), based on the 2005 Hong Kong film of the same title. The drama acquired very high viewership ratings, and boosted Hu's popularity to a new high. Hu won the Popularity award at the 1st China Student Television Festival, and Best Actor in the fantasy genre at the 2010 Huading Awards.

To avoid being typecast, Hu subsequently stopped accepting any role in period dramas after he finished filming The Myth. He took on leading roles in modern dramas; Bitter Coffee (苦咖啡, 2011), Modern People (摩登新人类, 2012) and Unbeatable (无懈可击之高手如林, 2012), as well as war drama Shangri-La (香格里拉, 2012). He also starred in the 2011 historical film 1911, playing Lin Juemin, and was nominated as Best New Actor at the 31st Hundred Flowers Awards.

Hu returned to historical fantasies in Xuan-Yuan Sword: Scar of Sky, adapted from the video game of the same name, where he also acted as the series' producer. His excellent portrayal of his character's paradoxical personality earned him another Best Actor in the fantasy genre at the 2012 Huading Awards, as well as the Most Popular Actor award at the 4th China TV Drama Awards. The same year, he participated in CES's nano-movie Refresh 3+7. He wrote the script for one of the stories Lights from the City, and starred in 4 out of the 10 stories.

2013: Forays into theater
2013 has often been referred to as Hu Ge's year of Theatre plays. He acted as Patient No.5 in Stan Lai's A Dream Like a Dream, which served as the opening act at the 1st Wuzhen Theatre Festival. Hu's performance in A Dream Like A Dream especially surprised many theatre critics, and garnered positive reviews all round. He won the Best Actor award at the 2nd Denny Awards for his performance.

He then starred as Xu Zhuang Tu in Forever Yin Xueyan, a play based on Pai Hsien-yung's novel of the same title performed in the Shanghai dialect. He won the Most Popular Actor award at the Shanghai Culture Center, and the Most Popular Theater Actor of the Year at the BQ Magazine Popular Artists Ceremony.

2014–2016: Career resurgence and critical acclaim
In 2014, Hu Ge starred in modern drama Life Revelations alongside Yan Ni, and won the People's Choice award at the 9th Seoul International Drama Awards for his performance. He then starred in historical romance drama Sound of the Desert, based on the novel Ballad of the Desert written by Tong Hua. Originally cast in the role of the leading male role, Hu decided to take on the role of the second male lead instead, as it was a type of character he has never played before. The same year, he garnered a Best Supporting Actor nomination at the 21st Shanghai Television Festival for his performance in acclaimed war drama, Forty Nine Days: Memorial. With three successful dramas, Hu won the Most Popular Actor award at the 6th China TV Drama Awards.

In 2015, Hu starred in espionage drama The Disguiser, which was popular with viewers and received considerably high ratings, with a market share above 8%. This was followed by Nirvana in Fire, a turning point in Hu's acting career, and a commercial and critical success in its own right. Hu Ge won awards at two of the most prestigious television awards in China for his role in Nirvana in Fire. He won Best Actor at the 22nd Shanghai Television Festival; and snagged a double victory by claiming both the Best Actor award and the Most Popular Actor award at the 28th China TV Golden Eagle Award.

He then starred in modern drama Good Times (大好时光), written by Life Revelations writer Wang Liping. All three of his dramas in 2015 were listed under the "2015 China TV Drama Selection" by the State Administration of Press, Publication, Radio, Film and Television.

In 2016, Hu starred in sports drama Go! Goal! Fighting! as a soccer coach. He returned to the big screen in December 2016, starring as an antagonist in the crime suspense film Cherry Returns. The same year, CBN Weekly crowned him the most commercially valuable actor in China.

2017–present: Hiatus and focus on films

The unprecedented surge in popularity in 2015 brought immense pressure. Hu admitted at the end of that year that he wished to take a break from acting. That wish was eventually fulfilled in the spring of 2017. He disappeared from the public eye for much of the year. In 2017, Hu starred in Game of Hunting, a drama produced by critically acclaimed director and screenwriter Jiang Wei. The series was filmed back in 2015 and premiered on Hunan TV in November 2017. Hu was later nominated for the Best Actor award at the Shanghai Television Festival for his role as a headhunter.

In 2018, Hu was cast in Diao Yinan's drama film The Wild Goose Lake. It was selected to compete for the Palme d'Or at the 2019 Cannes Film Festival. The same year, Hu made a guest appearance in romance film Last Letter directed by Shunji Iwai.

In 2019, Hu was cast as the male lead in the sports biographic film about tennis player Li Na, directed by Peter Chan. The same year, he was cast in the adventure drama film  The Climbers .

In the winter of 2019, cast in the lead male role (zhu, Shaoyu), Hu joined co-star Wen Qi in "A Touch of Warm,” a crime film directed by Kang Bo. Due to the COVID-19 pandemic, filming was suspended until the winter of 2020. The almost one-year gap rendered many of the finished scenes unusable and had to be re-shot. It wrapped on February 22, 2021, and is currently in post-production.

In 2020, Hu announced his return to the small screen with period drama Blossoms Shanghai directed by Wong Kar-wai, based on the award-winning novel Blossoms by Jin Yucheng.

Personal life

Accident and recovery
Hu Ge was involved in a highway car accident on 29 August 2006 while traveling from Hengdian to Shanghai. According to later interviews, he didn't remember anything from the accident because he was asleep in the passenger seat at the time of the crash and suffered from post-traumatic amnesia. He survived with severe injuries while his assistant died. Hu had to undergo surgeries, some to repair disfiguring wounds to his face, and the entire healing process took approximately one year. The filming of The Legend of the Condor Heroes, which he was working on then, was temporarily halted due to his injury, in addition to being unable to complete promoting his finished project The Young Warriors with his fellow cast members. Hu Ge expresses how he felt of the incident through the performance of his single "Dare to Love", and filmed a music video with his co-star from the two series and friend Cecilia Liu.

Soon after the accident, he also published a book Scavenger of Happiness, filled with his thoughts on the accident and post events, interesting childhood events, well wishes from good friends and previously unexposed pictures. This book documented in detail the process of how Hu Ge changed from a young idol with a smooth career path into an increasingly mature actor who could truthfully face life's problems as a scavenger of happiness.

Marriage and children
On January 31, 2023, Hu published a post on Weibo announcing that he just had a newborn daughter, and admitted that he had purposely concealed the news of his personal life and marriage.

Filmography

Film

Animation film

Television series

Theater

Discography

Albums

Singles

Other appearances

Bibliography

Endorsements and ambassadorship
Following his surge in popularity and public awareness, Hu has also been appointed the Shanghai Tourism Ambassador in 2015. Professional designers from Madame Tussauds Shanghai took measurements from Hu to make two wax figures of him; one of himself and one of his character Mei Changsu from Nirvana in Fire, which was unveiled in September 2016.
 
In 2016, Hu Ge was named brand ambassador of Emporio Armani in China and Asia Pacific. In the same year, he also became brand ambassadors for Piaget Chanel Perfume and Cosmetics, and EF Education First.

In 2020, Hu Ge was promoted from regional ambassador to global ambassador of Giorgio Armani, the first actor to hold such a title.

Awards and nominations

Forbes China Celebrity 100

References

External links
 
 Official Instagram

1982 births
21st-century Chinese male actors
Male actors from Shanghai
Living people
Chinese Mandopop singers
Chinese male voice actors
Singers from Shanghai
Chinese male film actors
Chinese male television actors
Shanghai Theatre Academy alumni
Tangren Media
21st-century Chinese male singers
Tisch School of the Arts alumni